Oceana Fine is a 1990 novel by the Australian author Tom Flood. It won the 1988 Australian/Vogel Literary Award, 1990 Victorian Premier's Literary Award for Fiction, and the 1990 Miles Franklin Literary Award.

1989 Australian novels
Miles Franklin Award-winning works